The Anabar (in its upper course: Большая Куонамка Bolshaya Kuonamka) is a river in Sakha, Russia.

Course
The Anabar is formed at the confluence of the Malaya Kuonamka and Bolshaya Kuonamka at the edge of the North Siberian Lowland. The two rivers forming it have their sources in the northeastern part of the Anabar Plateau, part of the Central Siberian Plateau. There are many lakes in its basin.

The Anabar basin is located between rivers Khatanga and Olenyok. The mouth of the river is in the Anabar Bay. The Uele river flows into the Laptev Sea close to the mouth of the Anabar, but it is not its tributary.

Tributaries

History
Historically Evenks have inhabited the basin of the Anabar River. Vasiliy Sychev was the first Russian to reach the river in 1643.

In present times the basin of the Anabar river is notable as the location of the largest concentration of diamond deposits in the world outside of Africa and Australia. These deposits made the Soviet Union into one of the world's largest producers of diamonds, and remain the economic mainstay of the area.

See also
List of rivers of Russia

References

External links

Rivers of the Sakha Republic
Drainage basins of the Laptev Sea
North Siberian Lowland